The Albanian Videoclip Festival (Albanian:Netet e Klipit Shqiptar) is an Albanian music awards event honouring the best of Albanian music videos from the Albanian diaspora. It made its debut in 2002 and ever since has been broadcast on all the main Albanian TV outlets around the Balkans. The event is based in Tirana, Albania and produced by DeliArt Association.

Winners

2002
 Mihrije Braha

2003
 Hueyda El Saied

2004
 Leonard Bombaj and Kripmjaltezat

2005
 Ritmi i Rruges

2006
 Genta Ismajli

2007
 Vagabondi

2008
 Alban Skënderaj

2009
 Blinera feat. Hekuran Krasniqi

2010
 Shpat Deda

2011
Big Basta

External links
 Official website
 
Music festivals established in 2002